The Brazil national beach soccer team represents Brazil in international beach soccer competitions and is controlled by the CBF, the governing body for football in Brazil. Portugal, Russia, Spain and Senegal are the only squads to have eliminated Brazil out of the World Cup. Brazil are ranked 1st in the BSWW World Rankings. They are, alongside Portugal, the only team to have won the world title before and after FIFA assumed the government of beach soccer worldwide.

Results and fixtures

The following is a list of match results in the last 12 months, as well as any future matches that have been scheduled.

Legend

2021

Players

Current squad
The following players and staff members were called up for the 2021 FIFA Beach Soccer World Cup.

Head coach: Gilberto Costa
Goalkeeping coach: Julio Cesar Franco

Player records

Top goalscorers

*Players in bold are still active with Brazil.

Competitive record

Beach Soccer World Championships (no FIFA)

FIFA Beach Soccer World Cup

Honours

Mundialito de Futebol de Praia
Winners (14): 1994, 1997, 1998, 1999, 2000, 2002, 2004, 2005, 2006, 2007, 2010, 2011, 2016, 2017

South American Beach Soccer League
Winners (2): 2017, 2018

Copa Latina
Winners (9): 1998, 1999, 2001, 2002, 2003, 2004, 2005, 2006, 2009

CONCACAF and CONMEBOL Beach Soccer Championship
Winner (1): 2005

CONMEBOL Beach Soccer Championship
Winners (8): 2006, 2008, 2009, 2011, 2015, 2017, 2019, 2021

Beach Soccer Intercontinental Cup
Winner (3): 2014, 2016, 2017

References

External links
Brazil at FIFA
Brazil at BSWW
 Brazil at Beach Soccer Russia

South American national beach soccer teams
National sports teams of Brazil
Beach soccer in Brazil